Sarai Bareman is a Samoan New Zealand born former footballer of Samoan and Dutch descent who represented Samoa. She is the current Chief Women's Football Officer for FIFA. She attended Massey High School in West Auckland, New Zealand.

Career
As a player, Bareman played club football based in Auckland, New Zealand before moving to Samoa and representing the Samoa women's national football team.

As a football administrator, Bareman also started her journey in Samoa after leaving a 10 year career in the banking and finance industry in New Zealand. She was first employed as the Finance Manager for the Football Federation of Samoa, responsible for all financial matters of the national association. This appointment came at a critical time in the associations history as they had recently been suspended by FIFA for misuse of funds by the previous administration.

After a short time in the role, Bareman was promoted to the Chief Executive Officer (CEO) where she took over the reigns of the national governing body and played an instrumental role in rebuilding the sport in the country. Bareman became a prominent figure in the Pacific sporting landscape after speaking at the Pacific Youth and Sports Conference held in 2013 about her experiences as female leader in a male dominated industry.

In 2014, Bareman moved back to Auckland to take up a role as the Deputy Secretary General for the Oceania Football Confederation.

After the 2015 FIFA corruption case, Bareman was appointed as the only women on the FIFA Reforms Committee. As part of the reform, Bareman advocated strongly for increasing the number of women in leadership roles within FIFA and football organisations, as well as more resourcing and prioritisation of the women's game. The reforms were approved in February 2016 at the FIFA Congress and later in the year, she was appointed as FIFA's first Chief Women's Football Officer 

In 2018, Bareman conducted the draw for the 2018 FIFA U-20 Women's World Cup in France, her first World Cup at the helm of global women's football. Later that year Bareman also oversaw the FIFA U-17 Women's World Cup in Uruguay. In 2019, Bareman played a key role in the delivery of the 2019 FIFA Women's World Cup in France.

Bareman also led the development of FIFA's first ever global strategy for women's football, which was launched in October 2018.

References

Year of birth missing (living people)
Samoan women's footballers
New Zealand sportswomen
Women FIFA officials
Living people
Women's association footballers not categorized by position
Women association football executives
New Zealand sportspeople of Samoan descent
New Zealand people of Dutch descent